Ensignbus is a bus and coach operator and bus dealer based in Purfleet, Essex. As of March 2023, it is a part of the FirstGroup.

History

Ensignbus was formed in 1972 by Peter Newman, who remains involved today as chairman and his sons Ross and Steve as directors. Ensignbus commenced with a small number of bus contracts for the Port of London Authority and Lesney Products and later diversified into bus sales and operating open top bus tours.

It was announced on 8 February 2023 that with the retirement of its owner Peter Newman and his sons Ross and Steve, Ensignbus was to be purchased by the FirstGroup, with its bus dealer business and bus service operations remaining separate from the operations of First Essex. The company's heritage fleet operation was not included the sale and remains with the Newman family. The last day of independent operations was on 9 March 2023.

Bus sales
The company came to prominence in the UK when London Transport decided to dispose of its unpopular and poor performing Daimler Fleetlines from 1979. Ensignbus was the only company willing to bid for all these buses as one batch, numbering over 2,000 buses, as preferred by London Transport.

As the vehicles arrived, Ensignbus moved to larger premises in Purfleet. While some were scrapped, Ensign sold many of these buses to operators around the country and abroad, with many ex-municipal companies and new operators requiring cheap re-inforcements for enhanced competition following the deregulation of bus services in 1986. Over 400 were sold to China Motor Bus in Hong Kong.

During the London Pride Sightseeing operation, Ensignbus continued selling buses in smaller numbers from a site in Rainham. With the sale of London Pride, Ensignbus moved to another site in Purfleet, and grew its sales business.

Ensignbus was involved in the sale of London's AEC Routemaster buses following their withdrawal from regular use. As of 2013, it was the largest used bus dealer in the UK.

Open top tour operations
In October 1985, Ensignbus purchased the London Pride Sightseeing open top bus tour business. Through links gained by selling open top buses to other operators around the world, Ensignbus expanded the concept to other cities setting up new tours. In January 1998, the open-top tour business was sold.

Starting in 1998 with an operation in Seville, in 1999, Ensignbus launched the City Sightseeing global sightseeing bus brand with a worldwide franchise model, and proceeded to rapidly expand into several cities. In May 2002 City Sightseeing bought out its main rival Guide Friday.

In November 2000, Ensignbus reacquired the London Pride Sightseeing business but sold it in 2001 to The Original Tour. In June 2004, Ensignbus purchased Bath Bus Company and transferred its City Sightseeing operations in Cardiff, Eastbourne, and Windsor to the company.

In February 2011, the Bath Bus Company business was sold to the RATP Group. In April 2011, Ensignbus sold City Sightseeing to Enrique Ybarra.

London tendered services
As a result of deregulation in the mid 1980s Ensignbus expanded into tendered London Buses work in East London. Starting with one or two routes, Ensignbus gained a network of routes, using several second hand vehicles and batches of new vehicles:
8 1989 built Alexander bodied Leyland Olympian double-deckers
5 1989 built Northern Counties bodied Leyland Olympian double-deckers
16 1988 built MCW Metrobus double-deckers

In July 1989, it purchased the business of Frontrunner South East from Stagecoach East Midlands with route 248 and 252. In December 1990, Ensignbus sold its London tendered bus services to Hong Kong company Citybus with the Dagenham depot and 87 buses. It was rebranded as Ensign Citybus and then Capital Citybus.

Ensignbus briefly re-entered London tendered services in 1998, taking over routes 324 and 348 from First Capital who had bought Capital Citybus. Routes 325 and 509 were later added before Ensignbus once again sold its London services in December 1999, this time to Town & Country Buses.

Essex and Kent services
In 2004, Ensignbus commenced operating a 12-month rail replacement contract in Kent for South Eastern Trains while the Higham and Strood tunnels were closed to strengthening. To make use of the dead running from its Purfleet depot, route X80 Chafford Hundred to Gravesend via Lakeside and Bluewater Shopping Centres was introduced. It proved successful and hence was kept going after the rail contract finished, albeit being cut back to run between Chafford Hundred & Lakeside to Bluewater only. In 2006, Ensignbus commenced operating services under contract to Thurrock Council and began operating services in Thurrock in competition with Arriva Southend. As at October 2016, it operated 16 routes. In April 2017, Ensign took over two further routes in Thurrock from Amber Coaches.

In June 2019, Jetlink X1, a night bus service between London Southend Airport and London Victoria via Lakeside Shopping Centre, Canning Town, and Embankment stations commenced. It was withdrawn after a few weeks due to Ensignbus being denied access to Southend Airport. It recommenced on 5 October 2019  but was withdrawn again in March 2020 due to the COVID-19 Pandemic.

On 17 June 2019, Ensignbus' services in Brentwood were taken over by NIBS Buses.

Today

Today, Ensignbus retains a small bus service network centred on Grays station and Lakeside Shopping Centre. It also regularly provides buses for rail replacement services to train operators including Abellio Greater Anglia, c2c, Southeastern, and Transport for London.

Ensignbus also operates a dealership selling used buses from several major UK and Irish operators. In 2016, it became a dealer for BCI products, starting with the BCI Enterprise high capacity integral double-decker. The company acts as a partner to Vantage Power, a firm developing technology to retrofit existing buses with diesel-electric hybrid engines.

Ensignbus maintains a fleet of heritage buses with AEC Regent III, AEC Routemaster, Daimler Fleetline, Leyland Titan, MCW Metrobus, and Scania Metropolitans represented. As well as being available for charter, Ensignbus operate these at an annual running day on the first Saturday in December each year.

Fleet
As of February 2023, Ensignbus operates 55 single and double deck buses, which are a combination of new and second-hand purchases. Fleet livery is light blue and silver. The fleet includes six hybrid electric buses delivered in 2012.

See also
Capital Citybus
City Sightseeing
London Pride Sightseeing

References

External links

Company website

Auto dealerships of the United Kingdom
FirstGroup bus operators in England
Bus operators in Essex
Bus operators in Kent
City Sightseeing
Former London bus operators
Purfleet
Transport companies established in 1972
Transport in Essex
Transport in Thurrock
Vintage bus operators in the United Kingdom
1972 establishments in England